Gigafactory New York (also known as Giga New York or Gigafactory 2) is factory leased by Tesla in Riverbend, Buffalo, New York. The factory, owned by the State of New York, was built on brownfield land remediated from a former steel mill. Construction of the factory, rebranded as RiverBend, started in 2014 and was completed in 2016–17. It makes photovoltaic (PV) cells and Tesla Superchargers, among other products.

In 2013, the site of Giga New York was planned as a clean energy business incubation center. As SolarCity acquired Silevo in 2014 and merged into Tesla two years later, the factory was planned. The factory, in a partnership with Panasonic, started limited assembly of photovoltaic modules in 2017 using imported Japanese PV cells. It began commercial production of modules in 2017. In 2018, SolarCity began production of individual solar cells. In late 2019 or early 2020 Tesla began commercial installation of version 3 of its "Solar Roof" product manufactured at the factory.

Panasonic stopped manufacturing solar panels at the factory in 2020. The same year, Tesla began producing charging equipment for its Supercharger network at the factory, and its solar deployments grew to 205 megawatts of generating capacity. Due to the COVID-19 pandemic, employment at the factory decreased in the first half of 2020, but by the end of 2021, the number of employees at the factory had increased to more than 1,460, as Tesla had promised New York State.

Early history

Background 
Republic Steel and Donner Hanna Coke operated a steel mill along the Buffalo River on the 88-acre Riverbend, South Buffalo site from early in the 20th century to its closing in 1984. As a response to the regional manufacturing downturn related to deindustrialization in the Rust Belt, the State of New York created an economic stimulus package, later dubbed the "Buffalo Billion", providing $1 billion in unearmarked economic investments for the Buffalo area. In 2013, Governor Andrew Cuomo announced the Buffalo High-Tech Manufacturing Hub at Riverbend, targeting the Republic Steel site, then a brownfield, for the development of a clean energy business incubation center that was to be funded with $225 million from the Buffalo Billion fund. At the time, the two companies announced as tenants were lighting manufacturer SORAA and solar panel manufacturer Silevo, which promised 475 jobs. Development of the site would be managed by the SUNY Colleges of Nanoscale Science and Engineering, now SUNY Polytechnic Institute.

In 2014, SolarCity detailed plans to acquire Silevo for $200 million, subsequently scaling up plans for the Buffalo gigafactory. The company outlined a construction timetable and hiring goals promising an eventual 3,000 jobs in Buffalo with 5,000 statewide, and $5 billion in economic activity. The new plans abandoned the research center design in favor of the construction of a 1.2 million square foot factory. As a result, the state increased the incentives offered to $750 million.

Construction and opening 
Ground broke in September 2014. The facility was completed in late 2016 and was furnished with equipment through 2017. As of August 2017, production of solar panels had begun at the factory.

Rationale 
Before Tesla and Panasonic began their partnership in Buffalo, Panasonic already had 30 years of experience producing solar panels. Because SolarCity incorporated the manufacturing process that Silevo had intended to use for production, the partnership allowed Tesla to outsource production and reduce its reliance on debt. The technology used incorporates nanotechnology, an emerging sector in upstate New York that colleges and universities such as SUNY Poly and Erie Community College have developed programs and research in, with the latter offering semiconductor and nanotechnology programs specifically for employment at the gigafactory. The facility also takes advantage of tax incentives and leasable space from the State of New York. Tesla CEO Elon Musk has also suggested that the company's solar panels could be helpful in humanitarian crises, such as rebuilding the electric grid of Puerto Rico in the aftermath of Hurricane Maria.

In 2015, SolarCity's CEO, Lyndon Rive, a cousin of Elon Musk, stated that the new facility would be key to creating a clean energy-manufacturing market, adding that expansion would not be possible at the Riverbend plant, but more likely in the immediate area. While SolarCity operated a pilot production and R&D facility in Fremont, California, the Gigafactory provides capacity for 10,000 solar panels per day, equivalent to one gigawatt per year.

Operations 
The factory began production of solar cells in 2017, and assembly of photovoltaic modules for solar panels, under Panasonic. In January 2018, Tesla announced, after testing on employees' roofs, that it would begin installing its new product on commercial customers' homes "within the next few months". Tesla delayed mass-production of the Solar Roof because of its focus on the ramp up of the Tesla Model 3 and development of a third version of the Solar Roof; in October 2019, it announced that version 3 of the Solar Roof was ready to begin production and ramp up installations over the next several months.

By early 2020 Tesla began commercial installation of version 3 of the Solar Roof product. Tesla has also begun producing charging equipment for its Supercharger network at the factory. In its results for the second and third quarters of 2020, Tesla reported that its solar energy operations were continuing to ramp up, partly because the company reduced the price of its standard solar products below the US industry average as part of a renewed marketing push, and partly as it gained more experience in installing the Solar Roof, hired more solar installers, and also sought growth through third-party installers. After delays in solar deployments due partly to the COVID-19 pandemic, Tesla's 2020 solar deployments grew by 17% in 2020 to 205 megawatts of generating capacity, including 86 megawatts during the fourth quarter, up 59% from the 4th quarter of 2019.

Jobs commitment 
In 2018, Tesla committed to providing 1,460 jobs at the factory by April 2020. By early 2020, employment at Giga New York had increased to 1,834, including 376 Panasonic employees who left the factory when Panasonic ceased manufacturing solar panels there later in 2020. Due to the COVID-19 pandemic, however, employment at the factory decreased to 474 as of April 30, 2020, and the company requested and received another year to meet its hiring commitment. The company received another extension until the end of 2021 to reach the employment target at the plant. If it had failed to meet that deadline, the state could have imposed a $41 million fine. By the end of 2021, the number of employees at the factory had increased to more than 1,460, meeting the commitment.

Criticism and lawsuit
The project has faced criticism and legal actions regarding allegations of inflated job promises, cost overruns, construction delays, bid rigging, a perceived lack of effort from Musk, and claims that the deal was, in effect, a bailout of Musk's cousins Peter and Lyndon Rive. In April 2022, a Delaware trial court dismissed the lawsuit by Tesla shareholders, holding that Musk did not impermissibly interfere in the acquisition even though he "was more involved in the process than a conflicted fiduciary should be", and that since the acquisition "Tesla’s value has massively increased".

See also 
 List of Tesla factories

References

External links 
 Official website

Manufacturing plants in the United States
New York
Buildings and structures in Erie County, New York
2017 establishments in New York (state)